Derek Frenette (born July 13, 1971) is a Canadian former professional ice hockey left winger.

Frenette spent two seasons with Ferris State University of the Central Collegiate Hockey Association (CCHA) before playing one season with the Hull Olympiques of the QMJHL. Drafted in the sixth round, 124th overall in the 1989 NHL Entry Draft by the St. Louis Blues, Frenette spent parts of five professional ice hockey seasons with the Peoria Rivermen of the International Hockey League (IHL) and the Detroit Falcons of the Colonial Hockey League (CoHL).

Career statistics

External links

1971 births
Canadian ice hockey left wingers
Detroit Falcons (CoHL) players
Ferris State Bulldogs men's ice hockey players
Hull Olympiques players
Ice hockey people from Quebec
Living people
People from Dollard-des-Ormeaux
Peoria Rivermen (IHL) players
St. Louis Blues draft picks